Dudleyaspis is an extinct genus of Lower to Middle Devonian odontopleurid trilobites that lived in a shallow sea that lay between Euramerica and Gondwana. It was named in 1949 by Prantl & Pribyl.

Fossils of Dudleyaspis have been found in the following locations:
Australia: Bathurst (Jesse Limestone), Mudgee (Flirtation Hill) and Murrumbateman (Black Bog Formation – Yarwood Siltstone Member)
Canada: Northwest Territories (Mackenzie Mountains – Delorme and Whittaker Formations) and Nunavut (Bailie-Hamilton and Cornwallis Islands – Cape Phillips Formation)
Czech Republic: Prague (Loc. 5.2 – C. colonus Zone)
England: Cannock (Shelve District) and Dudley (Wren's Nest – Much Wenlock Limestone Formation)
France: Coumiac (Coumiac quarry – Coumiac Formation)
Sweden: western Gotland (Visby – Rönnklint sea cliff and Kättelviken)
United States: Illinois (Chicago – Racine Dolomite and Kankakee – Racine Dolomite), Iowa (Hopkinton Dolomite), Oklahoma (Anadarko – Henryhouse Formation) and Wisconsin (Milwaukee – Racine Dolomite)

References 

Odontopleurida
Trilobite genera
Fossil taxa described in 1949